Maheshpur is a village development committee in Jhapa District in the Province No. 1 of south-eastern Nepal. At the time of the 1991 Nepal census it had a population of 49,060.
It lies about 14 km from Bangladesh.

References

Populated places in Jhapa District